Acianthera appendiculata is a species of orchid plant native to the Dominican Republic.

References 

appendiculata
Flora of the Dominican Republic
Plants described in 1912
Flora without expected TNC conservation status
Taxa named by Alfred Cogniaux